Beowa National Park, formerly Ben Boyd National Park, is a national park in New South Wales, Australia,  south of Sydney.

History
The park was established in 1971 covering 8,900 hectares (35 sq. mi.) and was originally named after Benjamin Boyd. In September 2022 after consultations with more than 60 representatives from Aboriginal and South Sea Islander communities the park was renamed Beowa. It has since been expanded to cover 10,486 hectares (40 sq. mi.). Boyd was a wealthy pastoralist and businessman in the 1840s, with interests in shipping (including whaling), based on the South Coast of NSW.  At the time, the area was part of the District of Port Phillip and Boyd was elected to the NSW Legislative Council for the electoral district of Port Phillip.  He was the first in Australia to engage in blackbirding, a practice akin to slavery, when a ship he had commissioned brought 65 Melanesian labourers to Boyd Town in 1847. In the wake of the George Floyd protests around the world and in Australia and the Black Lives Matter movement gaining pace in May–June 2020, calls for the National Park to be renamed were renewed. Matt Kean, the NSW Environment Minister, commented that "national parks are about connecting people, not dividing them", and promised to seek a briefing about renaming the park and then to consult with local elders and the community.

Boyd commissioned the construction of a sandstone tower overlooking the entrance to the harbour of Twofold Bay to alert whaling crews of the approach of their prey. The tower was never completed. In November 2021, Kean announced Ben Boyd National Park would be renamed  and in September 2022 it was.

Description
The park consists of two sections, on either side of Twofold Bay and the town of Eden. The smaller northern section is bounded on its western border by the Princes Highway. The geology of this section is mainly sedimentary rock (ironstone and clay) laid down in the Paleogene, with some quartzite outcrops. The main attraction for tourists is the Pinnacles, a multicoloured erosion gully with white sands overlaid by rusty red clay. The southern section coastline is metamorphic and Devonian in age, with some heavily folded sections at Red Point, near Boyd's tower.

The park is fairly flat, with none of the northern section exceeding 100 metres (300') in elevation, and the southern section not much higher; the tallest peak is Haycock Hill at 252 metres (827'). The region is particularly windy, dry and cold, and the headlands are covered in a low ground-hugging heathland community of plants. Further inland, the heath is replaced by open eucalypt woodland, which makes up most of the park's habitat. The two dominant tree species are silvertop ash (Eucalyptus sieberi) and red bloodwood (Corymbia gummifera). There are also scattered pockets of rainforest in gullies and protected areas, with species such as the scentless rosewood (Synoum glandulosum) and smooth mock-olive (Notelaea venosa).

Wildlife
212 species of bird have been recorded in the park, with the heathlands being home to the eastern ground parrot and endangered eastern bristlebird. The little tern breeds in the sand dunes and beaches and is threatened by recreational four-wheel driving. The park forms part of the Ulladulla to Merimbula Important Bird Area, identified as such by BirdLife International because of its importance for swift parrots.

Fifty species of mammal have been recorded. Pests recorded include cats and foxes, both which have covered the park, occasional feral dogs, and rabbits in previously cleared areas and picnic areas. Bitou bush (Chrysanthemoides monilifera) is a problem weed north of the Pambula River.

References

Cited text

External links

Ben Boyd National Park official website, NSW National Parks & Wildlife Service

Important Bird Areas of New South Wales
National parks of New South Wales
Protected areas established in 1971
South Coast (New South Wales)
1971 establishments in Australia